West Gore is a small community in the Canadian province of Nova Scotia, located in  The Municipality of the District of East Hants in Hants County.

West Gore is a rural area. Once a thriving mining community, it is now mostly home to few farms and very few businesses.

References
West Gore on Destination Nova Scotia

Communities in Hants County, Nova Scotia
General Service Areas in Nova Scotia